The Société des Avions Caudron was a French aircraft company founded in 1909 as the Association Aéroplanes Caudron Frères by brothers Gaston and René Caudron. It was one of the earliest aircraft manufacturers in France and produced planes for the military in both World War I and World War II. From 1933 onwards, it was a subsidiary of Renault.

Alphonse (Gaston) (1882–1915) and René Caudron (1884–1959)

Born in Favières, Somme to parents who farmed nearby in Romiotte, the Caudron brothers were educated at a college in Abbeville. Gaston, as Alphonse was always known, intended to become an engineer but his education was cut short by health problems; René was interested in the development of mechanics and was a sportsman. After military service in an artillery regiment, they returned to work on the farm.

They began to build their first aircraft, a large biplane, in August 1908. Initially unable to obtain an engine, they flew it as a glider, towed by a horse, and tested it through the summer. In September 1909, they finally flew it under power.

Gaston Caudron died in an aircraft accident on 15 December 1915 at the airfield at Bron. René continued in the aircraft business until the fall of France at the start of World War II. He died in 1959.

Caudron Frères and Caudron-Renault

They set up a flying school there which was functioning by 19 May 1910. This activity flourished and by early 1913 a second school had been set up at Juvisy with a combined capacity of 100–250. The War Ministry sent about 30 student pilots there in 1913. By then the company was based at Rue, Somme. During World War I, the company moved its production to Lyon and Issy-les-Moulineaux, as the Somme plant was too close to the battle front.

Designers of many aircraft like the two-seater Caudron G.3 that successfully landed on Mont Blanc in 1921, Caudron produced the trainers in which thousands of pilots got their first flying licence. The Caudron plants at Lyon and Issy-les-Moulineaux produced nearly 4,000 airplanes during World War I. In 1920, the Lyon plant stopped assembling and the Issy-les-Moulineaux site was consolidated as the headquarters and main production base. In 1933, Caudron was acquired by Renault, following pressure from the French Air Ministry, which was seeking consolidation in the aircraft industry. At the time, Renault was increasing its involvement in the aviation field. Renault took a controlling 55% stake while René Caudron kept the remaining 45%. both the Société des Avions Caudron and Renault's aircraft engine branch were integrated into the Renault Aviation division led by François Lehideux (as top manager), Marcel Riffard (as aircraft body chief designer) and Charles-Edmond Serre (aircraft engine chief designer). The Issy-les-Moulineaux plant improved synergies with the Billancourt engine plant, as both were in the Paris area. In 1937, Renault bought out René Caudron's minority stake.

As part of Renault, Caudron centred on producing light, sportier aircraft powered by either inline-four or inline-six cylinder engines, mirroring its automotive range at the time. Riffard was an expert on streamlined designs, which helped to achieve good speeds on low power. Caudron-Renault aircraft set several records in the 1930s. In August 1934, Hélène Boucher, on board her C 450, achieved the world record average speed for 100 kilometres, 1000 kilometres, and the world female speed record. In December 1934, Raymond Delmotte got a land aircraft world speed record of 505 km/h on board his C 460. According to Popular Aviation, by November 1935 Caudron-Renault was producing the following models: the C 272-3 Luciole (2-seat light biplane aircraft), the C 282-8 Phalene VIII (4-seat light monoplane), the C 360 (monoplane), the C 366 Atalante (a monoplane based on an earlier model), the C 440 (twin-engined low-wing cabin monoplane), the C 450 (1-seat racing monoplane), the C 460 (1-seat racing monoplane) and the C 530 Rafale (high-performance, 2-seat light monoplane).

By 1936, Renault was hit by the Great Depression and, in 1938, it spun off Caudron-Renault into a separate, autonomous subsidiary in order to focus on its core automotive business. After France was occupied by Nazi Germany during World War II, Caudron-Renault produced trainers, auto bodies, Messerschmitt aircraft parts, Messerschmitt Bf 108s the Caudron's Simoun and Goéland ranges, the Siebel Si-204, for the Wehrmacht. It also repaired aircraft. In February 1942, Willy Messerschmitt requested that Caudron produce the Messerschmitt Me 164, a Si-104 rival, but that was sabotaged. The Issy-les-Moulineaux plant was almost completely destroyed by RAF and AAF bombings that took place in September 1943, leaving it permanently out of production. In 1944, the remaining Caudron-Renault operations were nationalised by the French government and became part of the Société Nationale de Construction aéronautique du Centre.

Aircraft
(Association Aéroplanes Caudron Frères / Société des avions Caudron)

 Hydroaéroplane Caudron-Fabre
 Caudron Type A
 Caudron Type B.2
 Caudron Type C
 Caudron Type D
 Caudron Type E
 Caudron Type F
 Caudron Type G
 Caudron G.2
 Caudron G.3
 Caudron G.4
 Caudron G.6
 Caudron Type H
 Caudron Type J
 Caudron Type K
 Caudron Type L
 Caudron Type M
 Caudron Type N
 Caudron Type O
 Caudron Type P
 Caudron R
 Caudron R.3
 Caudron R.3
 Caudron R.4
 Caudron R.5
 Caudron R.6
 Caudron R.8
 Caudron R.9
 Caudron R.10
 Caudron R.11
 Caudron R.12
 Caudron R.14
 Caudron R.15
 Caudron R.19
 Caudron C.02
 Caudron C.20
 Caudron C.21
 Caudron C.22
 Caudron C.23
 Caudron C.25
 Caudron C.27
 Caudron C.33
 Caudron C.37
 Caudron C.39
 Caudron C.43
 Caudron C.51
 Caudron C.59
 Caudron C.60
 Caudron C.61
 Caudron C.61bis
 Caudron C.65
 Caudron C.66
 Caudron C.67
 Caudron C.68
 Caudron C.74
 Caudron C.77
 Caudron C.81
 Caudron C.91
 Caudron C.92
 Caudron C.97
 Caudron C.98
 Caudron C.99
 Caudron C.101
 Caudron C.103
 Caudron C.104
 Caudron C.107
 Caudron C.109

 Caudron C.110
 Caudron C.113
 Caudron C.117
 Caudron C.125
 Caudron C.127
 Caudron C.128
 Caudron C.128/2
 Caudron C.140
 Caudron C.150
 Caudron C.157
 Caudron C.159
 Caudron C.160
 Caudron C.161
 Caudron C.168
 Caudron C.180
 Caudron C.183
 Caudron C.190
 Caudron C.191
 Caudron C.192
 Caudron C.193
 Caudron C.220
 Caudron C.221
 Caudron C.230
 Caudron C.232
 Caudron C.240
 Caudron C.250
 Caudron C.251
 Caudron C.270 Luciole
 Caudron C.272 Luciole
 Caudron C.272/2 Luciole
 Caudron C.272/3 Luciole
 Caudron C.272/4 Luciole
 Caudron C.272/5 Luciole
 Caudron C.273 Luciole
 Caudron C.275 Luciole
 Caudron C.280 Phalene
 Caudron C.280/2 Phalene
 Caudron C.280/6 Phalene
 Caudron C.280/9 Phalene
 Caudron C.282 Super Phalene
 Caudron C.282/4 Super Phalene
 Caudron C.282/8 Super Phalene
 Caudron C.282/10 Super Phalene
 Caudron C.286 Super Phalene
 Caudron C.286/2 Super Phalene
 Caudron C.286/2.S4 Super Phalene
 Caudron C.286/4 Super Phalene
 Caudron C.286/5 Super Phalene
 Caudron C.286/6 Super Phalene
 Caudron C.286/7 Super Phalene
 Caudron C.286/8 Super Phalene
 Caudron C.286/9 Super Phalene
 Caudron C.289 Super Phalene
 Caudron C.289/2 Super Phalene
 Caudron C.340 Micro Phalene
 Caudron C.344 Phalène Junior
 Caudron C.360
 Caudron C.362
 Caudron C.366
 Caudron C.400 Super Phalene
 Caudron C.401 Super Phalene
 Caudron C.410 Super Phalene
 Caudron C.430 Rafale
 Caudron C.440 Goéland
 Caudron C.441 Goéland
 Caudron C.444 Goéland
 Caudron C.445 Goéland

 Caudron C.445/1 Goéland
 Caudron C.445/2 Goéland
 Caudron C.445/3 Goéland
 Caudron C.445M Goéland
 Caudron C.445R Goéland
 Caudron C.446 Super Goéland
 Caudron C.447 Goéland
 Caudron C.448 Goéland
 Caudron C.449 Goéland
 Caudron C.449/1 Goéland
 Caudron C.449/2 Goéland
 Caudron C.449/3 Goéland
 Caudron C.449/4 Goéland
 Caudron C.449/5 Goéland
 Caudron C.450
 Caudron C.460
 Caudron C.461
 Caudron C.480 Frégate
 Caudron C.490
 Caudron C.491
 Caudron C.500 Simoun I
 Caudron C.510 Pélican
 Caudron C.520 Simoun
 Caudron C.530 Rafale
 Caudron C.560
 Caudron C.561
 Caudron C.570
 Caudron C.580
 Caudron C.600 Aiglon
 Caudron C.601 Aiglon
 Caudron C.610 Aiglon
 Caudron C.620 Simoun IV
 Caudron C.630 Simoun
 Caudron C.631 Simoun
 Caudron C.632 Simoun
 Caudron C.634 Simoun
 Caudron C.635 Simoun
 Caudron C.635M Simoun
 Caudron C.640 Typhon
 Caudron C.641 Typhon
 Caudron C.660 Rafale
 Caudron C.670 Typhon
 Caudron C.680
 Caudron C.684
 Caudron C.685 Super Rafale
 Caudron C.690
 Caudron C.710 Cyclone
 Caudron C.711 Cyclone
 Caudron C.712 Cyclone
 Caudron C.713 Cyclone
 Caudron C.714 Cyclone
 Caudron C.720 Cyclone
 Caudron-Renault CR.760 Cyclone
 Caudron-Renault CR.770 Cyclone
 Caudron C.800 Epervier
 Caudron C.801
 Caudron C.810
 Caudron C.811
 Caudron C-815
 Caudron C.860
 Caudron C.870
 Caudron C.880
 Caudron KXC
 Caudron Navy Experimental Type C Trainer
 Caudron LEI

References

External links
 Aviation Pioneers: An Anthology – Gaston & René Caudron
 Caudron C.460 at air-racing-history.com
 Aviafrance list of Caudron aircraft
 La société des Frères Caudron 

Renault
Defunct aircraft manufacturers of France
Manufacturing companies established in 1909
Manufacturing companies disestablished in 1944
French companies established in 1909
1944 disestablishments in France
1933 mergers and acquisitions